Indre Sogn District Court was a district court in Sogn og Fjordane county, Norway. The court was based in the village of Sogndalsfjøra. The court existed from around 1630 until 2005. It had jurisdiction over the municipalities located in the areas surrounding the inner Sognefjorden. This included the municipalities of Sogndal, Aurland, Leikanger, Luster, Lærdal, and Årdal. Cases from this court could be appealed to Gulating Court of Appeal.

The court was a court of first instance. Its judicial duties were mainly to settle criminal cases and to resolve civil litigation as well as bankruptcy. The administration and registration tasks of the court included death registration, issuing certain certificates, performing duties of a notary public, and officiating civil wedding ceremonies. Cases from this court were heard by a combination of professional judges and lay judges.

History
In 1591, the Sogn District Court was established when the district court system was implemented in Norway. Around 1630, the court's jurisdiction was split into Ytre Sogn District Court in the east and Indre Sogn District Court in the west. In 2005, the court's jurisdictional area was merged into the new Sogn District Court (along with the municipalities of Balestrand and Vik which were from the Ytre Sogn District Court which also closed).

References 

Defunct district courts of Norway
Courts and tribunals established in 1630
1630 establishments in Norway
Courts and tribunals disestablished in 2005
2005 disestablishments in Norway